Prudziszki  is a village in the administrative district of Gmina Jeleniewo, within Suwałki County, Podlaskie Voivodeship, in north-eastern Poland.

During the German occupation of Poland (World War II), on April 26, 1940, the Germans carried out a massacre of 13 Poles from the region in the forest of Prudziszki as part of the Intelligenzaktion. Among the murdered were teachers, a local official and a military officer.

References

Prudziszki